Cyrus Willard Kendall (March 10, 1898 – July 22, 1953) was an American film actor.  He appeared in more than 140 films between 1935 and 1950. Kendall's heavy-set, square-jawed appearance and deep voice were perfect for wiseguy roles such as policemen and police chiefs, wardens, military officers, bartenders, reporters, and mobsters. 

On old-time radio, Kendall portrayed Judge Carter in the drama The Remarkable Miss Tuttle. On early television, he played detective Jonas Flint on the game show Armchair Detective. 

Kendall was born in St. Louis, Missouri and died in Woodland Hills, California.

Filmography

 His Night Out (1935) - Detective (uncredited)
 Hitch Hike Lady (1935) - Fruit Dealer (uncredited)
 Dancing Feet (1936) - Hotel Detective
 Man Hunt (1936) - Sheriff at Hackett
 King of the Pecos (1936) - Alexander Stiles
 Dancing Pirate (1936) - Bouncing Betty's Cook (uncredited)
 The Lonely Trail (1936) - Adjutant General Benedict Holden
 San Francisco (1936) - Headwaiter (uncredited)
 Hot Money (1936) - Joe Morgan
 Women Are Trouble (1936) - Inspector Matson
 Sworn Enemy (1936) - Simmons
 Bulldog Edition (1936) - Nick Enright
 Sea Spoilers (1936) - Detective
 The Public Pays (1936, Short) - Police Chief John Carney (uncredited)
 The Magnificent Brute (1936) - Chief of Police (uncredited)
 Once a Doctor (1937) - Dr. Deardon (scenes deleted)
 Midnight Court (1937) - Milt - the Reporter (uncredited)
 Land Beyond the Law (1937) - Slade Henaberry
 Angel's Holiday (1937) - Chief of Police Davis
 It Could Happen to You (1937) - Detective
 Public Wedding (1937) - Police Captain (uncredited)
 Meet the Boyfriend (1937) - Walters
 They Won't Forget (1937) - Detective Laneart
 White Bondage (1937) - Rickets (uncredited)
 Hot Water (1937) - Chief of Police (uncredited)
 The Shadow Strikes (1937) - Brossett
 Borrowing Trouble (1937) - Chief Kelly
 She Loved a Fireman (1937) - Deputy Fire Commissioner (uncredited)
 The Invisible Menace (1938) - Colonel Rogers
 Gold Is Where You Find It (1938) - Kingan (uncredited)
 Hawaii Calls (1938) - Hawaiian Policeman
 The Girl of the Golden West (1938) - Hank - Gambler (scenes deleted)
 Rawhide (1938) - Sheriff Kale
 Crime School (1938) - Morgan
 Safety in Numbers (1938) - Chief of Police
 Little Miss Thoroughbred (1938) - District Attorney Sheridan
 Valley of the Giants (1938) - Sheriff Graber
 Breaking the Ice (1938) - Judd
 The Night Hawk (1938) - Capt. Teague
 Young Dr. Kildare (1938) - Charlie (uncredited)
 Next Time I Marry (1938) - A.L. Butterfield (uncredited)
 Pacific Liner (1939) - Deadeyes
 Stand Up and Fight (1939) - Foreman Ross
 North of Shanghai (1939) - Minor Role (uncredited)
 Twelve Crowded Hours (1939) - George Costain
 Trouble in Sundown (1939) - Ross Daggett
 Man of Conquest (1939) - Indian Affairs Agent (uncredited)
 Mickey the Kid (1939) - Waldo (uncredited)
 Frontier Marshal (1939) - Winning Card Player (uncredited)
 Fugitive at Large (1939) - Prison Guard Captain
 The Angels Wash Their Faces (1939) - Haines
 Blackmail (1939) - Southern Sheriff (uncredited)
 Calling All Marines (1939) - Big Joe Kelly
 The Hunchback of Notre Dame (1939) - Nobleman Signing Petition (uncredited)
 The Green Hornet (1940, Serial) - Curtis Monroe
 The House Across the Bay (1940) - Crawley
 Women Without Names (1940) - Guard (uncredited)
 My Favorite Wife (1940) - Police Detective Arresting Nick (uncredited)
 Opened by Mistake (1940) - Oberweiser (uncredited)
 Men Without Souls (1940) - Capt. White
 The Saint Takes Over (1940) - Max Bremer
 Prairie Law (1940) - Pete Gore
 Andy Hardy Meets Debutante (1940) - Mr. Carrillo
 Gold Rush Maisie (1940) - Assayer (uncredited)
 Sky Murder (1940) - Harrigan - House Detective (uncredited)
 Junior G-Men (1940) - Brand
 Hullabaloo (1940) - Mr. Wilson
 Youth Will Be Served (1940) - Sheriff
 The Fargo Kid (1940) - Nick Kane
 Robin Hood of the Pecos (1941) - Ambrose Ballard
 Ride, Kelly, Ride (1941) - Louis Becker
 They Dare Not Love (1941) - Maj. Kenlein (uncredited)
 Billy the Kid (1941) - Cass McAndrews (Sheriff)
 Blossoms in the Dust (1941) - Harrington (uncredited)
 Mystery Ship (1941) - Condor
 Honky Tonk (1941) - Man with Tar (uncredited)
 Johnny Eager (1941) - Halligan
 Pacific Blackout (1941) - Hotel Clerk
 Fly-by-Night (1942) - Dahlig
 Born to Sing (1942) - Police Captain
 Alias Boston Blackie (1942) - Jumbo Madigan
 The Wife Takes a Flyer (1942) - Gestapo Agent (uncredited)
 Sunday Punch (1942) - Boxing Promoter (uncredited)
 Tarzan's New York Adventure (1942) - Colonel Ralph Sergeant
 Boston Blackie Goes Hollywood (1942) - Jumbo Madigan (uncredited)
 Road to Morocco (1942) - Fruit Vendor (uncredited)
 Silver Queen (1942) - Sheriff
 A Night to Remember (1942) - Louis Kaufman (uncredited)
 After Midnight with Boston Blackie (1943) - Joe Herschel (uncredited)
 A Gentle Gangster (1943) - Al Malone
 A Lady Takes a Chance (1943) - Gambling House Boss
 The Chance of a Lifetime (1943) - Jumbo Madigan (uncredited)
 Whispering Footsteps (1943) - Detective Brad Dolan
 Meatless Flyday (1944, Short) - Spider (voice, uncredited)
 Lady in the Death House (1944) - Detective
 The Whistler (1944) - Gus, Bartender (uncredited)
 Outlaw Trail (1944) - Honest John Travers
 The Chinese Cat (1944) - Webster Deacon
 Roger Touhy, Gangster (1944) - Edward Latham (uncredited)
 Christmas Holiday (1944) - Teddy Jordan (uncredited)
 Wilson (1944) - Charles F. Murphy (uncredited)
 Kismet (1944) - Herald (uncredited)
 Crime by Night (1944) - Sheriff Max Ambers
 Tall in the Saddle (1944) - Cap, Bartender (uncredited)
 The Last Ride (1944) - Capt. Butler
 A Wave, a WAC and a Marine (1944) - Mike
 Girl Rush (1944) - 'Honest' Greg Barlan
 Mystery of the River Boat (1944, Serial) - Police Chief F.E. Dumont
 Dancing in Manhattan (1944) - Inspector Kirby
 Tahiti Nights (1944) - Chief Enoka
 She Gets Her Man (1945) - Police Chief Brodie
 Jungle Queen (1945, Serial) - Tambosa Tim [Chs. 6-8]
 The Cisco Kid Returns (1945) - Jennings - Hired killer
 Docks of New York (1945) - Compeau
 The Power of the Whistler (1945) - Druggist (uncredited)
 A Thousand and One Nights (1945) - Auctioneer (uncredited)
 Secret Agent X-9 (1945, Serial) - Lucky Kamber
 Shadow of Terror (1945) - Victor Maxwell
 The Tiger Woman (1945) - Inspector Henry Leggett
 Cornered (1945) - Detective (uncredited)
 Scarlet Street (1945) - Nick (uncredited)
 The Scarlet Horseman (1946) - Amigo Mañana
 The Glass Alibi (1946) - Red Hogan
 Without Reservations (1946) - Bail Bondsman (uncredited)
 Blonde for a Day (1946) - Inspector Pete Rafferty
 Inside Job (1946) - Police Capt. Martin (uncredited)
 The Invisible Informer (1946) - Sheriff Ladeau
 Lady in the Lake (1946) - Jailer (uncredited)
 Sinbad the Sailor (1947) - Hassan-Ben-Hassan (uncredited)
 The Farmer's Daughter (1947) - Sweeney
 Desperate (1947) - Ace Morgan (uncredited)
 Bury Me Dead (1947) - Detective (uncredited)
 Joe Palooka in Fighting Mad (1948) - Commissioner R.E. Carfter
 Call Northside 777 (1948) - Second Bartender (uncredited)
 Perilous Waters (1948) - The Boss
 Tenth Avenue Angel (1948) - Higgins (uncredited)
 Sword of the Avenger (1948) - Count Velasquez
 Race Street (1948) - Shoeshine Customer (uncredited)
 In This Corner (1948) - Tiny Reed
 Bungalow 13 (1948) - Police Officer (uncredited)
 Queen Esther (1948) - Chamberlain
 Mysteries of Chinatown (1949, TV Series) - Regular Player (1949-1950)
 Nancy Goes to Rio (1950) - Capt. Ritchie (uncredited)

References

External links

1898 births
1953 deaths
American male film actors
American male radio actors
Male actors from St. Louis
20th-century American male actors
American male television actors